José Andrés Anchondo García (born 10 November 1962) is a Mexican archer. He competed at the 1988 Summer Olympics, the 1992 Summer Olympics and the 1996 Summer Olympics.

In 2015 he was named head coach of the archery team at the Autonomous University of Chihuahua.

References

External links
 

1962 births
Living people
Mexican male archers
Olympic archers of Mexico
Archers at the 1988 Summer Olympics
Archers at the 1992 Summer Olympics
Archers at the 1996 Summer Olympics
Pan American Games medalists in archery
Pan American Games silver medalists for Mexico
Archers at the 1987 Pan American Games
Archers at the 1991 Pan American Games
Medalists at the 1987 Pan American Games
Medalists at the 1991 Pan American Games
Sportspeople from Chihuahua (state)
20th-century Mexican people